Those Who Remained is a 2019 Hungarian drama film directed by Barnabás Tóth. Based on the 2003 novel Férfiidők lányregénye  (2021 English edition Those Who Remained)  by Zsuzsa Várkonyi. It was selected as the Hungarian entry for the Best International Feature Film at the 92nd Academy Awards, making the December shortlist.

Plot
A 16-year-old girl and a middle-aged doctor connect in Budapest after World War II, each mourning their families lost in concentration camps.

Cast
 Károly Hajduk as Körner Aladár
 Abigél Szõke as Wiener Klára
 Mari Nagy as Olgi
 Barnabás Horkay as Pepe
 Katalin Simkó as Erzsi

See also
 List of submissions to the 92nd Academy Awards for Best International Feature Film
 List of Hungarian submissions for the Academy Award for Best International Feature Film

References

External links
 

2019 films
2019 drama films
Hungarian drama films
2010s Hungarian-language films
Films about the aftermath of the Holocaust